Dong Nai (written Đồng Nai in Vietnamese) may refer to

Đồng Nai Province
Đồng Nai river
Đồng Nai, Lâm Đồng

Đồng Nai Bridge
Đồng Nai (newspaper)